A translation management system (TMS), formerly globalization management system (GMS), is a type of software for automating many parts of the human language translation process and maximizing translator efficiency.  The idea of a translation management system is to automate all repeatable and non-essential work that can be done by software/systems and leaving only the creative work of translation and review to be done by human beings.  A translation management system generally includes at least two types of technology: process management technology to automate the flow of work, and linguistic technology to aid the translator. 

In a typical TMS, process management technology is used to monitor source language content for changes and route the content to various translators and reviewers.  These translators and reviewers may be located across the globe and typically access the TMS via the Internet.

Translation management systems are most commonly used today for managing various aspects translation business.

Naming 
Although translation management systems (TMS) seems to be the currently favoured term in the language localisation industry, these solutions are also known as globalization management systems (GMS) or global content management systems (GCMS). They work with content management systems (CMS) as separate, but linked programs or as simple add-ons that can answer specific multilingual requirements.

Overview 
A TMS typically connects to a CMS to manage foreign language content. It tends to address the following categories in different degrees, depending on each offering:
 Business administration: project management, resource management, financial management. This category is traditionally related to enterprise resource planning (ERP) tools.
 Business process management: workflow, collaboration, content connectors. This category is traditionally the domain of specialised project management tools.
 Language management: integrated translation memory, webtop translation tools, customer review and markup. This is traditionally performed with specialised translation tools.

CMS excels at process management while ignoring business management and translation tools, which are strongholds of TMS.

Features and benefits 
The measurable benefits of using a TMS are similar to those found in a CMS, but with a multilingual twist: the localization workflow is automated, thus reducing management and overhead costs and time for everyone involved; localization costs are reduced, time to market is decreased and translation quality improves; finally, the cooperation between headquarters and national branches increases thanks to more thorough reporting.
A typical TMS workflow goes through the following steps:

Change detection of updated or new materials is a must either with standard off-the-shelf CMSs or with the use of custom-developed connectors in the case of proprietary systems. Content is automatically extracted from the CMS and packaged for transmission to the TMS. In some cases, file manipulation may be needed for later analysis and translation. Project managers customise workflows to match their business needs. Every participant in the workflow receives a notification where there is new work to be done, and a unique number is assigned to every project and every task for traceability. Translators and revisers work either online or offline and their queries and comments are tracked through the system. Translators or revisers receive comments from the customer's in-country reviewers to verify and implement any corrections. After the documents are approved, the TM is automatically updated for later reuse. Finally, the translated materials are returned into their CMS for publishing and productivity and efficiency metrics are available through reports.

Linguistic technology generally includes at least translation memory and terminology database; some systems also integrate machine translation technology. Translation memory is a database of all previously translated sentences. While a translator performs translation, he or she is automatically prompted with similar sentences from the memory that were previously translated. A terminology database is a glossary that contains specific words and phrases and their context-appropriate translations. 

A machine translation system is a program that uses natural language processing technology to automatically translate a text from one language to another.

Future 
Future trends in TMSs include:
interoperation with more CMS offerings: content managers should be able to order translations within their own environment
tie in with text authoring environments: for existing multilingual content leverage against new writing
incorporation of business management functions: to preview the localization cost and timeframe
integration with enterprise systems: general ledger applications and sales force automation tools

Target markets and licensing 
TMS vendors target two main buyers when marketing and selling their products. On the one hand, software developer-only companies attract content producers, and sell their offering with no strings attached. On the other hand, software developers can also be language service providers (LSPs), so they offer their language services over their custom-made technological offering for easier customer integration. The latter is commonly referred to as a captive solution, meaning that buyers must use the TMS developer's language services in order to take advantage of their platform.

Content producers with preferred or previous language service agreements to third LSPs may prefer to maintain their independence and purchase software licences only. However, a combined option of technology solution and language services in one package is bound to be more cost effective. Similarly, LSPs may prefer to contact technology vendors who are not part of the competition, offering also language services. Many LSPs got nervous when SDL bought Trados in 2005, becoming the biggest translation technology provider, while still having language services as part of their activities. As a result of this, competitive cloud translation management systems that combine TMS functionality with CAT tools and online translation editors, started making their way to the market.

See also 
Computer-assisted translation
Internationalization and localization

References 

Translation software
Content management systems
Internationalization and localization